Fr. Micheál P Mac Gréil S.J. (23 March 1931 – 21 January 2023), was a Jesuit priest, sociologist, writer and activist from Ireland.

Biography
Micheál Mac Gréil was born in Clonaslee, County Laois on 23 March 1931, and grew up near Westport, County Mayo. Fr. Mac Gréil was educated by the Christian Brothers in Westport, and served in the Irish Army from 1950 until 1959 as a cadet and officer. Mac Greil studied at Louvain, Kent State University, Milltown Park and  University College Dublin from where he gained his doctorate in sociology in 1976. A lecturer in Sociology the National University at St. Patrick's College, Maynooth from 1971 until he retired in 1996, he also lectured for a time in UCD.

An activist and an advocate on many issues such as Prison Reform, Irish Language, Irish Travellers, the decriminalisation of homosexuality and, more recently, the Western Rail Corridor. Mac Greil’s lifelong dedication to social justice brought him into some extraordinary situations. For two consecutive Septembers in 1968 and 1969, he lived on the roadside as a Traveller in disguise to learn about the social, personal and cultural mores of Irish Travellers. 
He retired as a lecturer in NUIM and was appointed to a parish in Westport, County Mayo.
In 1980, Dr. Mac Gréil revived the tradition of making a pilgrimage to Máméan. In 1981, he chaired a special working party on the Jesuit Catholic Workers College, which was to evolve into the National College of Ireland.
Fr. Mac Gréil has published many books, papers and reports on social issues and attitudes in Ireland.

In 1994 Mac Gréil served as president of AONTAS, the Irish national adult learning organisation.

MacGréil died on 21 January 2023, at the age of 91.

Publications
A psycho-socio-cultural theory of prejudice: As tested in data collected from selected samples in the Philadelphia and Cleveland metropolitan areas (1966)
Community In The Making (1970)
Prejudice And Tolerance In Ireland (1978) - won the Christopher Ewart-Biggs Memorial Prize
The Sligo-Limerick Railway: a Case for Its Restoration (1981)
Memoirs, 1911-86  James Horan (1992)
Prejudice in Ireland Revisited with the Survey and Research Unit, St. Patrick's College, Maynooth (1996)
Quo Vadimus. Ca Bhfuil Ar dTriall?/Where are We going? (1998)
Report on Religious Attitudes in Ireland (2007-2008)
The Emancipation of The Travelling People (2010)
Pluralism and Diversity in Ireland: Prejudice and Related Issues in Early 21st Century Ireland (2012)
The Ongoing Present: A Critical Look at the Society and World in which I Grew Up (2014) (Messenger Publications)

References 

1931 births
2023 deaths
20th-century Irish Jesuits
21st-century Irish Jesuits
20th-century Irish historians
21st-century Irish historians
Irish sociologists
Alumni of University College Dublin
Alumni of Milltown Institute of Theology and Philosophy
Academics of St Patrick's College, Maynooth
People associated with the National College of Ireland
People from Westport, County Mayo